Maurice Richard Arena is a 4,750-seat multi-purpose arena at Olympic Park in Montreal, Quebec, Canada. It was built in 1962. It is named in honour of Maurice Richard.

The rink was renovated in 1994, the arena includes a multi-media exhibition on the life of the Montreal Canadiens great. Entrance to the arena is free and there is a souvenir shop onsite. Formerly home to the Montreal Rocket, the ice rink is also used for training by speed and figure skaters. It can host corporate events, with banquet seating for up to 2,000.

The arena also hosted boxing and wrestling events at the 1976 Summer Olympics. The building is located on the same massive city block that is home to Olympic Stadium and Saputo Stadium. It is situated in the south east corner, next to the Biodome (formerly the cycling Velodrome) and the Olympic Stadium. The arena still hosts fight cards and concerts, and hosted the 2014 Scotties Tournament of Hearts.

References
1976 Summer Olympics official report. Volume 2. pp. 86–89.

Indoor ice hockey venues in Canada
Indoor arenas in Quebec
Quebec Major Junior Hockey League arenas
Sports venues in Montreal
Venues of the 1976 Summer Olympics
Olympic boxing venues
Olympic wrestling venues
Mercier–Hochelaga-Maisonneuve
Boxing venues in Quebec
Sports venues completed in 1962
1962 establishments in Quebec